Paleontology in Wisconsin refers to paleontological research occurring within or conducted by people from the U.S. state of Wisconsin. The state has fossils from the Precambrian, much of the Paleozoic, and the later part of the Cenozoic. Most of the Paleozoic rocks are marine in origin. Because of the thick blanket of Pleistocene glacial sediment that covers the rock strata in most of the state, Wisconsin’s fossil record is relatively sparse. In spite of this, certain Wisconsin paleontological occurrences provide exceptional insights concerning the history and diversity of life on Earth.

Prehistory

Precambrian

Many metamorphic, igneous and sedimentary rock units are exposed in the north-central part of Wisconsin. Although they are mostly barren of fossils, some of the sedimentary ones contain stromatolites.

Cambrian

Exposures of Cambrian rock units, many of which are fossiliferous, occur in western and central Wisconsin, especially along the banks of the Mississippi, Saint Croix and Wisconsin Rivers. Most of the rocks are Upper Cambrian; however, others are thought to be Middle Cambrian. Fossils of many groups of organisms have been found including stromatolites, conulariids, brachiopods, gastropods, monoplacophorans, trilobites, graptolites, and conodont elements. Wisconsin’s Cambrian rocks have also produced fossils of more aglaspidid (a grouping of arthropods closely related to trilobites) species (around 12) than those of any other state. A portion of central Wisconsin known as Blackberry Hill is a Konservat-Lagerstätte famous for its many types of trace fossils, mass strandings of jellyfish, and especially for producing fossils of one of the first animals to emerge from the sea and walk on land (i.e., a species of euthycarcinoid).

Ordovician

Many fossiliferous Lower to Upper Ordovician rock units are exposed in the southwestern portion of Wisconsin. These include many species of stromatolites, fungi, sponges, conulariids, rugose corals, tabulate corals, bryozoans, brachiopods, gastropods, monoplacophorans, bivalves, nautiloids, trilobites, ostracods, crinoids, graptolites, and conodont elements.

Silurian

  

Fossiliferous Silurian rocks are exposed in eastern Wisconsin, from the Door County peninsula to the Illinois border. Fossils include stromatolites, stromatoporoids, sponges, conulariids, rugose and tabulate corals, bryozoans, brachiopods, gastropods, monoplacophorans, bivalves, nautiloids, trilobites, ostracods, phyllocarids, cystoids, crinoids, graptolites, conodont elements, and jawless fish bones. During the Middle-Late Silurian, the area around modern Milwaukee contained a massive reef system. The fauna that lived there at that time is among the most diverse for its age on the entire continent. Donald G. Mikulic has called it "a textbook example of ancient reefs." Also of much significance is the Waukesha Biota, which is a Konservat-Lagerstätte famous for its superbly preserved fossils of strange arthropods, worms, and other organisms not previously recorded from Silurian rocks. Among the Waukesha Biota's fossil organisms seldom preserved in other Silurian occurrences are a synziphosurine, a possible cheloniellid, a thylacocephalan, a bizarre arthropod called Parioscorpio, an enigmatic bivalved arthropod, conodonts, lobopods, a leech and other 'worms,' graptolites, and chordates.

Devonian

Four Devonian formations are located in the southeastern portion of Wisconsin in the vicinity of Milwaukee. While all are fossiliferous to some degree, the youngest is entirely sub-surface, and the others are very limited in exposure and mostly inaccessible, except for occasional glacial erratics found in excavations and along the shore of Lake Michigan. In spite of its elusiveness, one unit---the Milwaukee Formation---has been found to have one of the most diverse biotas of its age (late Givetian) coming from a single formation. Its fossil biota includes around 250 species of agglutinated foraminifers, radiolarians, chitinozoans, conulariids, rugose and tabulate corals, tentaculitoids, bryozoans, hederelloids, brachiopods, hyoliths, gastropods, rostroconchs, bivalves, nautiloids, actinoceratoids, ammonoids, annelid worms (scolecodonts), trilobites, ostracods, phyllocarids, crinoids, blastoids, edrioasteroids, graptolites, conodont elements, fishes (placoderms, sharks, acanthodians, sarcopterygians), terrestrial fungi, and land plants (cladoxylopsids? and lycopods). It also includes many types of trace fossils.

Permian-Neogene

Rocks of Permian to Neogene age were either rarely deposited in Wisconsin or were eroded away by the Pleistocene glaciers and other erosional agents. As a result, dinosaurs and other organisms of this age did not leave many fossils in Wisconsin. Some ammonite fossils originating from the Coleraine Formation and dating to the middle Turonian epoch of the Late Cretaceous have been found reworked in glacial till, showing that some fossils from this time are present in Wisconsin. These include the species Placenticeras pseudoplacenta and Scaphites carlilensis.

Quaternary
During the Quaternary, deposition resumed; however, the local climate was cold and glaciers would come to cover nearly all of the state's land area. Wisconsin contains sediment from all of the Pleistocene glacial stages, especially the stage that bears the state's name. Hemlock and spruce trees formed forests inhabited by creatures like giant beavers, horses, and woolly mammoths.

History

Polymath naturalist Increase Allen Lapham is regarded as Wisconsin's first geologist. During the late 1830s Lapham discovered a wide variety of fossils in great abundance in some rocky hills near Milwaukee. He wondered about the stratigraphic relationship between the rocks preserving his fossils and those from New York described in James Hall's recent research. Lapham sent a sizable sampling of the local fossils to Hall in 1846. Hall began researching the area and in 1862 recognized the local reefs for what they were. The Silurian-aged reefs of the Milwaukee area were the first Paleozoic reefs in the world to be described for the scientific literature. They were also the first fossil reefs in North America to be properly recognized as such. Hall set out to formally describe the fossils of the reef, and found them to be among the most diverse of the period on the entire continent.  Lapham died in 1875 and most of his fossils and mineral specimens were sold to the University of Wisconsin. Sadly, most of his specimens were destroyed nine years later during a fire that consumed the university's science building. During the second half of the 19th century the region was prospected by "gentleman naturalists" who collected fossils on behalf of Hall and other well known paleontologists. Examples include T. A. Greene and E. E. Teller who collected near Milwaukee, P. R. Hoy, who collected near Racine, and F. H. Day, who collected in the Wauwatosa area. In 1877 research by T. C. Chamberlin uncovered differences in the composition and fossils of the reef-bearing rocks of the Milwaukee area as compared to those that didn't contain reefs. Donald G. Mikulic praised Chamberlin's research on the Milwaukee reefs as "a classic work of paleoecology and sedimentology". In the early 20th century the reefs commanded the research attention of figures like W. C. Alden, A. W. Grabau, and R. R. Schrock. Gradually scientific interest in the Silurian reefs of Milwaukee waned along with the decline in local quarrying.

Lapham, Greene, Teller, Day, and another gentleman naturalist, C. E. Monroe, also gathered extensive collections from the Devonian Milwaukee Formation. The majority of those fossils came from natural cement quarries that operated between 1876 and 1911 along the Milwaukee River in the area now occupied by Estabrook and Lincoln Parks. Greene and some of the others would pay the quarry workers for their fossil finds, resulting in large numbers of high quality fossils. These beds soon became well known for containing one of the most diverse Devonian fish faunas in the United States. Most of that material as well as that collected after closure of the quarries now resides in museums, such as the Thomas A. Greene Geological Museum, Milwaukee Public Museum, Weis Earth Science Museum, Field Museum of Natural History, National Museum of Natural History (Smithsonian), Museum of Comparative Zoology, and Buffalo Museum of Science. Much of that material has not been studied in depth for over one hundred years, but a preliminary study conducted in 2019 indicates that the Milwaukee Formation contains one of the richest and most diverse biotas in North America coming from a single formation of its age.

Other significant, more recent developments in Wisconsin paleontology include the discovery of the Waukesha Biota and Blackberry Hill, as discussed above.

The Silurian trilobite Calymene celebra was designated as Wisconsin's state fossil in 1985.

People
 Roy Chapman Andrews was born in Beloit on January 26, 1884.
 Amadeus William Grabau was born in Cedarburg on January 9, 1870.
 Everett C. Olson was born in Waupaca on November 6, 1910.

Natural history museums
 Cable Natural History Museum, Cable
 Milwaukee Public Museum, Milwaukee
 Thomas A. Greene Geological Museum , Milwaukee
 University of Wisconsin–Stevens Point Museum of Natural History,  Stevens Point
UW–Madison Geology Museum, Madison
 Weis Earth Science Museum, Menasha

See also

 Paleontology in Illinois
 Paleontology in Iowa
 Paleontology in Michigan
 Paleontology in Minnesota

Footnotes

References

 Barreto, Claudia,  Dale Springer, Judy Scotchmoor. July 1, 2005. "Wisconsin, US." The Paleontology Portal. Accessed September 21, 2012.

 Gass, Kenneth C. 2015. Solving the Mystery of the First Animals on Land: The Fossils of Blackberry Hill. Siri Scientific Press., 96 pp. 9780992997953
 Gass, Kenneth C., Kluessendorf, Joanne, Mikulic, Donald G. & Brett, Carlton E. 2019. Fossils of the Milwaukee Formation: A Diverse Middle Devonian Biota from Wisconsin, USA. Siri Scientific Press, 224 pp. 9780995749672
 
 Hayes, Paul G. Increase Allen Lapham: Wisconsin's First Geologist. Geoscience Wisconsin. Volume 18. 2001. 
 Mikulic, Donald G. The Reefs that Made Milwaukee Famous. Geoscience Wisconsin. Volume 18. 2001. 
 Mikulic, Donald G., Briggs, Derek E.G. & Kluessendorf, Joanne. New exceptionally preserved biota from the lower Silurian of Wisconsin, U.S.A. Philosophical Transactions of the Royal Society of London Series B 311 715-717 (1985). 
 Wendruff, Andrew J. 2016. Paleobiology and Taphonomy of Exceptionally Preserved Organisms from the Brandon Bridge Formation (Silurian), Wisconsin, USA. Ph.D Dissertation, Ohio State University. 
 Wisconsin Geological and Natural History Survey. . University of Wisconsin-Madison Division of Extension. Accessed November 15, 2019.

External links
 Geologic units in Wisconsin
 Paleoportal: Wisconsin Wisconsin paleontology and geology

 
Wisconsin
Natural history of Wisconsin
Science and technology in Wisconsin